Chegoggin is a community in the Canadian province of Nova Scotia, located in the Yarmouth Municipal District in Yarmouth County.

In 2000, Swedish archaeologist Mats Larsson of Lund University put forward a claim that Chegoggin is his prime candidate for the location of Leif Erikson's Vinland. Having explored up and down the coasts of Atlantic Canada, Larsson believes that Chegoggin best fits the description of Vinland as given in the Norse sagas.

References

Communities in Yarmouth County
General Service Areas in Nova Scotia